Koakuma Ageha (lit. "Little-devil  Swallowtail ") is a gyaru fashion and lifestyle magazine published monthly in Japan. Targeted at females in their late teens and 20s, Koakuma Ageha caters to the styles of Agejo (a combination of ageha and ojousama, which means "young miss")  and hime-gyaru (lit. "princess-gyaru"). It also incorporates different styles into the agejo style

Koakuma Ageha is noted for its significantly large circulation and its unique trait of relating to the hostess club (Japanese-style cabaret) culture, as it mainly targets women who work at hostess clubs as hostesses, and most of its models are hostesses who actually work at hostess clubs.

Sociologist Shinji Miyadai has described this magazine as a "textbook for hostesses". Some describe this magazine as the "bible for hostesses".

Koakuma Ageha ceased publication in April 2014 following the bankruptcy of its parent company, Inforest Publishing. It restarted in April 2015, on another publishing company Neko Publishing.

History
Koakuma Ageha was first published under the name "Koakuma & Nuts" in October 2005 with a 27-year-old woman, Hisako Nakajo, who had been familiar with the gyaru scene, as its chief editor. Koakuma & Nuts was only a special edition of the dark-skin oriented Happie Nuts gyaru fashion magazine, but after publication of the second issue, it changed its name to "Koakuma Ageha" and became monthly in October 2006. Circulation was then around 220,000 but climbed to 350,000 by the end of 2008. Hisako Nakajo left Koakuma Ageha, and its parent company Inforest Publishing, in November 2011.

Model and style
Koakuma Agehas exclusive models are called "Age-mo(s)", and its irregularly appearing models are called . Most of them are active hostesses from various cities "of the night" all over the islands of Japan. Unlike the ones in Happie Nuts, Ageha models are not required to be dark-skinned. Their unique styles of fashion is called , which has become quite popular among women in their teens and 20s. Some explain the typical "Ageha-kei" style as an "evolved form of the gyaru style, grown in the cradle of the hostess club scene, with an essence of yanki". The Ageha style, as a lifestyle, is noted for its tendency to be "local-oriented", in contrast to most other fashion-based lifestyles which tend to be Tokyo-centric.

Koakuma Ageha'''s uniqueness is also attributed to its tone; it features hostesses' lifestyles without romanticization, not just recounting the glamorous aspects, and although its main focus is, of course, fashion, it sometimes features the serious themes of "yami (simultaneously meaning "darkness " and "sickness ") in the human heart". Models talk actively about their "darksides" in their own way, and often reveal some "negative secrets" about their lives and pasts, such as the ones about delinquency, running away, hikikomori, bullying, betrayal, heartbreak, mental illness, trauma, suicide, self-image issue, sexuality, loneliness, abused childhood, domestic violence, and alcoholism. This is considered quite unique for a Japanese fashion magazine, as Japanese fashion magazines are in general relentlessly light-hearted from beginning to end.

Ageha models often garner an almost cult-like popularity and attract large amounts of media attention. Eri Momoka, known as "Momoeri", is an early example, and just like Momoka, who has her own brand "Moery", some Ageha models individually launch their own fashion brands. Sumire (1987–2009) launched her own fashion brand "Divas" and often introduced herself as the "Divas designer" during the last days of her life. Shizuka Mutoh, an irregularly appearing Ageha model, launched her own fashion brand "Rady" in 2008 and its monthly net earnings reached $1 million in April 2011.

Sister magazines

Ane AgehaAne Ageha (meaning "Older-sister Swallowtail") was first published in November 2010 under the name "Oneh-san Ageha" as a special edition of Koakuma Ageha, and it became independent in March 2011. Ane Ageha is a bi-monthly fashion and cosmetic magazine, and its target audience is females in their late twenties and older.

Kimono AgehaKimono Ageha was first published in December 2010 as a special edition of Koakuma Ageha. It is an irregularly published magazine specialized in kimono, and is modeled by Koakuma Ageha models.

I Love MamaI Love Mama «stylized as "I LOVE mama"» was first published in September 2008 under the name "Mama Nuts × Ageha" as a special co-edition of Koakuma Ageha with Happie Nuts. Mama Nuts × Ageha changed its name to "I Love Mama" and became monthly in March 2009. I Love Mama'' is a magazine especially for gyaru women who have gotten pregnant and become mothers (called "gyaru mama") — the first-ever magazine dedicated to gyaru-mamas.

See also 

 Japanese clothing

References

External links
"Koakuma Ageha" official 
"Ane Ageha" official 
"Kimono Ageha" official 

2005 establishments in Japan
Gyaru
Fashion magazines published in Japan
Lifestyle magazines published in Japan
Monthly magazines published in Japan
Women's magazines published in Japan
Magazines established in 2005
Women's fashion magazines